Pitbullterje is a 2005 Norwegian comedy film, that is based on the book by Endre Lund Eriksen. It stars Petrus A. Christensen as the lead role as Jim, and also Jørgen Foss as Terje. It also stars Robert Lindahl Haug, Vetle Næss, Charlotte Brodde, Rosa E. Bye, Kristin Skogheim, Atle Antonsen and Andreas Cappelen.

Plot
Jim is a 12-year-old outsider. He has a mother with anxiety and he lives a hard life. At school he is smallest in his class, and compelled to buy beer and smoke and have party's in his garage. Home is different: He's the father of the house, and takes care of his mother, who has isolated herself in bed with a video of the moon landing on VHS. She's not going out of her house due to anxiety. One day Terje (an overweight boy who claims to own a pit bull) starts in his class. He gets excluded from the class society, but he considers Jim as his best friend making him choose between an outsider friend and his poor social status.

Music
The song "Et Juleevangelium" is by the Norwegian group "Klovner i Kamp".

External links

2005 films
Norwegian comedy films
2000s Norwegian-language films